Platycrinites are an extinct genus of Paleozoic stalked crinoids belonging to the family Platycrinitidae.

These stationary upper-level epifaunal suspension feeders lived during the Devonian, Permian and the Carboniferous periods, from 376.1 to 259.0 Ma.

Species
Platycrinites crokeri Campbell and Bein 1971
Platycrinites ellesmerense Broadhead and Strimple 1977
Platycrinites halos Webster and Jell 1999
Platycrinites hemisphaericus (Meek & Worthen)
Platycrinites nikondaense Broadhead and Strimple 1977
Platycrinites omanensis Webster and Sevastopulo 2007
Platycrinites testudo Campbell and Bein 1971
Platycrinites wachsmuthi Wanner 1916
Platycrinites wrighti Marez-Oyens 1940

Description
These moderate sized extinct crinoids had a columnar stem with a twisted pattern. On top of the stem was a calyx with a number of feather-like arms.

Distribution
Fossils of this genus have been found in the Devonian of Germany, in the Carboniferous of Australia, Canada, China, Ireland, United Kingdom, United States. As well as in the Permian of Australia, Canada, Indonesia, Oman and United States.

References

Prehistoric crinoid genera
Prehistoric echinoderms of North America
Carboniferous crinoids
Fossils of Georgia (U.S. state)
Paleozoic life of Alberta
Paleozoic life of Nunavut